The South Kara Depression is the central part of the South Kara Basin of the Arctic shelf of Russia. It is covered with up to 12 km thick  of Neogene-Quaternary deposits.

References

Landforms of Nenets Autonomous Okrug
Kara Sea
Depressions of Russia